Dais glaucescens, commonly called havohoa in Malagasy, is a species of flowering plant in the family Thymelaeaceae that is native to central Madagascar. It was originally described by Joseph Decaisne in the Annales des Sciences Naturelles in 1843.

Description 

Distribution and habitat 
Dais glaucescens is native to the central areas of Madagascar.

Uses 
In Madagascar, the bark of Dais glaucescens is known as "havoa" and is used in the making of Antemoro paper. This practice of using the "beaten-bark technique" has been attributed to the Antemoro people as far back as 1661 by the French governor of Madagascar Étienne de Flacourt.

References 

Thymelaeoideae
Endemic flora of Madagascar
Flora of the Madagascar subhumid forests
Taxa named by Joseph Decaisne